Radford Island is an ice-covered island surmounted by several peaks, lying 6 nautical miles (11 km) west of Saunders Mountain in the east part of Sulzberger Ice Shelf. Discovered by the Byrd Antarctic Expedition on the Eastern Flight of 5 December 1929. This feature was mapped as a part of the mainland by the United States Antarctic Service (USAS) (1939–1941) and named "Radford Mountains." It was determined to be an island by the U.S. Geological Survey from air photos taken by the U.S. Navy, 1962–1965. Named by Byrd for V. Admiral Arthur W. Radford, U.S. Navy, Deputy Chief of Naval Operations (Air) during the exploration by U.S. Navy Operation Highjump (1946–1947) and later Admiral and Chairman of the Joint Chiefs of Staff.

See also 
 List of Antarctic and sub-Antarctic islands

Islands of Marie Byrd Land